Headington stone is a limestone from the Headington Quarry area of Oxford, England.

Geology
Around 160 million years ago, during the Late Jurassic period, Britain was located further south and was submerged beneath a subtropical sea. The warm conditions meant that coral reefs could flourish. When the coral died, it was buried under successive layers of sediment and other debris. After millions of years, this became fossilized. It formed the Corallian Limestone that is now beneath the Headington Quarry area of Oxford.

Quarrying
Historically, there were a number of stone quarries in Headington Quarry. Headington stone was traditionally used for a number of the older Oxford University college buildings. In 1396, stone from quarrying in Headington was used to build the bell-tower for New College. It was also used for Oxford's city walls. Headington stone was used in the 1520s by Cardinal Wolsey to build his Cardinal College, now known as Christ Church.

Headington stone was particularly good for building since it can be cut in any direction and thus carved relatively easily. The stone was employed in buildings outside Oxford such as for Eton College and Windsor Castle. Later stone extracted from the quarry was of less good quality, for example, that used to build the lower part of the Radcliffe Camera. The stone was prone to erosion by pollution.

Literature
The use of Headington stone in Oxford University buildings was mentioned by John Betjeman (1906–1984) in his poetry:

See also
 List of types of limestone

References

Limestone
Building stone
History of Oxford
History of the University of Oxford
Geologic formations of the United Kingdom
Geology of Oxfordshire
Jurassic England